(I am a Good Shepherd), 85, is a church cantata by Johann Sebastian Bach. He composed it in Leipzig for the second Sunday after Easter and first performed it on 15 April 1725.

History and words 

Bach composed the cantata in his second annual cycle in Leipzig for the second Sunday after Easter, called . The prescribed readings for that Sunday were from the First Epistle of Peter, Christ as a model, and from the Gospel of John, the Good Shepherd.

According to John Eliot Gardiner, the poet is likely the same as for two preceding cantatas, Bleib bei uns, denn es will Abend werden, BWV 6, and Am Abend aber desselbigen Sabbats, BWV 42, before Christiana Mariana von Ziegler became the poet for the following cantatas of the period. The three cantata texts were probably written for Bach's first year in Leipzig, but postponed due to the workload of the first performance of the St John Passion that year. They are a sequence on themes from the Gospel of John. The poet opens the cantata with the beginning from the Gospel, verse 11. The second movement explains that being a Good Shepherd was realized in the Passion. The thought is commented by the first stanza of Cornelius Becker's hymn "" (1598), a paraphrase of Psalm 23. The poet refers In movement 4 to verse 12 of the Gospel, the contrast of the shepherd who is awake to watch over the sheep, whereas the hired servants sleep and neglect them. Movement 5 names love as the shepherd's motivation to care for the sheep. The cantata ends with the chorale "", the fourth stanza of Ernst Christoph Homberg's hymn "" (1658).

Bach first performed the cantata on 15 April 1725.

Scoring and structure 

The cantata in six movements is scored for four vocal soloists (soprano, alto, tenor and bass), a four-part choir only in the chorale, two oboes, two violins, viola, violoncello piccolo and basso continuo.

 Aria (bass): 
 Aria (alto): 
 Chorale (soprano): 
 Recitative (tenor): 
 Aria (tenor): 
 Chorale (satb):

Music 
In the first movement, the bass as the vox Christi sings "I am a good shepherd", framed by instrumental ritornellos. The motif on these words appears already four times in the ritornello. The movement is between aria and arioso, with the oboe as a concertante instrument in "a mood of tranquil seriousness". The alto aria is accompanied by an obbligato violoncello piccolo. The chorale stanza is sung by the soprano on the tune of "Allein Gott in der Höh sei Ehr" by Nikolaus Decius, with a slightly ornamented melody, whereas the two oboes play a theme in ritornellos which is derived from the first line of the tune.

The only recitative is a miniature sermon, accompanied by the strings accenting phrases of the text. Movement 5 is the only movement in the cantata in pastorale rhythm. The strings, violins and viola's, play in unison, so in the low register. Thus the tenor voice frequently appears as the highest part, beginning with three times "" (look). Gardiner observes the similarity to an alto aria (movement 60) of the St Matthew Passion, similarities in both the theme "pastoral love emanating from the cross", and the music, described as "rich, flowing melody and gently rocking rhythm". The closing chorale is a four-part setting.

Recordings 
 Bach: Cantata 85; Cantata 151, Anthon van der Horst, De Nederlandse Bachvereniging, Amsterdam Kamerorkest, Hélène Ludolph, Wilhelmine Matthès, Tom Brand, Hermann Schey, Telefunken 1957
 Les Grandes Cantates de J.S. Bach Vol. 4, Pforzheim Chamber Orchestra, Ingeborg Reichelt, Hertha Töpper, Helmut Krebs, Franz Kelch, Erato 1959
 J. S. Bach: Kantate BWV 85 Ich bin ein guter Hirt, Karl Ristenpart, Chorus of the Conservatory of Sarrebruck, Chamber Orchestra of the Saar, Eva Bornemann, Helmut Kretschmar, Jakob Stämpfli, Saarländischer Rundfunk 1960
 Bach Kantaten, Vol. 8: BWV 103, BWV 85, BWV 86, BWV 144, Diethard Hellmann, Bachchor und Bachorchester Mainz, DdM-Records Mitterteich late 1960s?
 Les Grandes Cantates de J.S. Bach Vol. 24, Fritz Werner, Heinrich-Schütz-Chor Heilbronn, Württembergisches Kammerorchester Heilbronn, Hedy Graf, Barbara Scherler, Kurt Huber, Jakob Stämpfli, Erato 1970
 J. S. Bach: Das Kantatenwerk · Complete Cantatas · Les Cantates, Folge / Vol. 22 – BWV 84-90, Nikolaus Harnoncourt, Tölzer Knabenchor, Concentus Musicus Wien, Paul Esswood, Kurt Equiluz, Ruud van der Meer, Teldec 1977
 Die Bach Kantate Vol. 13, Helmuth Rilling, Gächinger Kantorei, Bach-Collegium Stuttgart, Arleen Augér, Gabriele Schreckenbach, Adalbert Kraus, Walter Heldwein, Hänssler 1981
 J. S. Bach: Cantatas with Violoncelle Piccolo, Christophe Coin, Das Leipziger Concerto Vocale, Ensemble Baroque de Limoges, Barbara Schlick, Andreas Scholl, Christoph Prégardien, Gotthold Schwarz, Auvidis Astrée / Naïve 1994
 Bach Edition Vol. 5 – Cantatas Vol. 2, Pieter Jan Leusink, Holland Boys Choir, Netherlands Bach Collegium, Ruth Holton, Sytse Buwalda, Nico van der Meel, Bas Ramselaar, Brilliant Classics 1999
 Bach Cantatas Vol. 23: Arnstadt/Echternach, John Eliot Gardiner, Monteverdi Choir, English Baroque Soloists, Katharine Fuge, William Towers, Norbert Meyn, Stephen Varcoe, Soli Deo Gloria 2000
 J. S. Bach: Complete Cantatas Vol. 15, Ton Koopman, Amsterdam Baroque Orchestra & Choir, Deborah York, Bogna Bartosz, Jörg Dürmüller, Klaus Mertens, Antoine Marchand 2001
 J. S. Bach: Cantatas Vol. 39, Masaaki Suzuki, Bach Collegium Japan, Carolyn Sampson, Robin Blaze, Gerd Türk, Peter Kooy, BIS 2007
 J. S. Bach: Cantatas for the Complete Liturgical Year Vol. 11, Sigiswald Kuijken, La Petite Bande,  Gerlinde Sämann, Petra Noskaiová, Christoph Genz, Jan van der Crabben, Accent 2008

References

Sources 
 
 Ich bin ein guter Hirt BWV 85; BC A 66 / Sacred cantata (3rd Sunday of Easter) Bach Digital
 Cantata BWV 85 Ich bin ein guter Hirt: history, scoring, sources for text and music, translations to various languages, discography, discussion, Bach Cantatas Website
 BWV 85 Ich bin ein guter Hirt: English translation, University of Vermont
 BWV 85 Ich bin ein guter Hirt: text, scoring, University of Alberta
 Luke Dahn: BWV 85.6 bach-chorales.com

Church cantatas by Johann Sebastian Bach
1725 compositions
Psalm-related compositions by Johann Sebastian Bach